{{DISPLAYTITLE:C6H7NaO6}}
The molecular formula C6H7NaO6 (molar mass: 198.11 g/mol, exact mass: 198.0140 u) may refer to:

 Sodium erythorbate
 Sodium ascorbate